Drossel may refer to:

In fiction:
 Drossel von Flügel, from the series Fireball
 Drossel Weissberg, a character from Atelier Firis: The Alchemist and the Mysterious Journey

People with the name Drossel:
 Heinz Drossel

German-language surnames

de:Drossel